Babel River is a stream in Bethel Census Area, Alaska, in the United States.

Babel River was named for the Tower of Babel after much confusion regarding its name.

See also
 List of rivers of Alaska

References

Rivers of Bethel Census Area, Alaska
Rivers of Alaska
Rivers of Unorganized Borough, Alaska